Miller's House at Spring Mill is a historic building in the Spring Mill section of Whitemarsh, Montgomery County, Pennsylvania, United States. Located about 200 feet (61 m) from where Spring Mill Creek empties into the Schuylkill River, it is about a quarter-mile (402 m) southeast of the Borough of Conshohocken.

The house was built about 1770, with an addition built about 1820.  It has a 2½-story, three-bay, stuccoed gneiss-stone main section with a gable roof, and four-bay vernacular-stone addition.  The Colonial-era house features vernacular Georgian-style architectural details.  It was built as the residence for the miller / owner of the formerly-adjacent gristmill.

"Spring Mill" was in operation by 1704, and gave its name to the creek and the surrounding area. It stood on the opposite side of North Lane from the house, along Spring Mill Creek. It was destroyed by fire in 1967.

The house was added to the National Register of Historic Places in 1989.

References

Houses on the National Register of Historic Places in Pennsylvania
Georgian architecture in Pennsylvania
Houses completed in 1770
Houses in Montgomery County, Pennsylvania
National Register of Historic Places in Montgomery County, Pennsylvania
1770 establishments in Pennsylvania